James of Jülich (Jacob van Gulik) (died 1392) was a Franciscan friar who, while falsely claiming to be a bishop, was sentenced by a tribunal of seven bishops to be boiled alive after it was discovered he had ordained a number of priests following his admittance as an auxiliary bishop by Floris van Wevelinkhoven, Bishop of Utrecht. Despite the scandal caused, his sentence was later mitigated in execution.

References

Year of birth missing
1392 deaths
German Franciscans
Impostors